Skye is a suburb in Melbourne, Victoria, Australia, 38 km south-east of Melbourne's Central Business District, located within the City of Frankston local government area.

History

Skye Post Office opened on 1 June 1889 and closed in 1895. In 1964, Lyndhurst South office (open since 1902) was renamed Skye. This office closed in 1972.

There is still a couple of houses standing from the 1890s today in Skye.

Prior to 15 December 1994, Skye was part of the City of Cranbourne (formerly the Shire of Cranbourne until April 1994). It still shares the postcode, 3977, with Cranbourne.

Today

The suburb has two schools, Skye Primary School and Lighthouse Christian College. The suburb has a number of newer housing developments (many which have been developed since 2005).

Southern Lights Church serves the Skye region.

Skye enjoys a large area of land to the east of the suburb which is outside the main growth area and is semi-rural. It forms a green wedge between Skye and Cranbourne West, which is in the neighboring municipality of the City of Casey.

Skye was ranked in 2015 as the least liveable suburb in Melbourne. Reasons cited for this included sewerage odour, a lack of public transport and a lack of shops. Nearby Sandhurst received a similarly negative ranking.

Sport

The suburb has an Australian Rules football team competing in the Southern Football League.

Golfers play at the Skye Public Golf Course on Ballarto and Taylors Roads, or at the course of the Sandhurst Club on Thompsons Road.

State Politics

Since the state election on 29 November 2014, The suburb of Skye has been represented by Labor MP Sonya Kilkenny in Victoria's Legislative Assembly. Skye falls within the Electoral district of Carrum.

See also
 City of Cranbourne – Skye was previously within this former local government area.
 City of Frankston – Skye is located within this local government area.
 List of Frankston people – notable people from the City of Frankston (including Skye).

References

Suburbs of Melbourne
Suburbs and localities in the City of Frankston